National Highway 143H, commonly referred to as NH 143H is a national highway in India. It is a secondary route of National Highway 43.  NH-143H runs in the states of Odisha and Jharkhand in India.

Route 
NH143H connects Joram, Ambapani, Salangabahal, Bihabandh and Litebeda in the states of Jharkhand and Odisha.

Junctions  

  Terminal near Joram.

See also 
 List of National Highways in India
 List of National Highways in India by state

References

External links 

 NH 143H on OpenStreetMap

National highways in India
National Highways in Jharkhand
National Highways in Odisha